Ninh Bình is a province of Vietnam in the Red River Delta region of the northern part of the country. The province is famous for a high density of natural and cultural attractions, including reserved parks in Cúc Phương National Park and Vân Long, grotto caves and rivers in Tràng An, Tam Cốc-Bích Động and Múa Caves, historic monuments in the Hoa Lư ancient capital, Vietnam's largest buddhist worshiping complex (Bái Đính Temple), and the Phát Diệm Cathedral with "eclectic architectural style". Thanks to its adjacency to Hanoi, day trips from the capital are easily manageable.

Administrative divisions
Ninh Bình is subdivided into eight district-level sub-divisions:

 6 districts:

 Gia Viễn
 Hoa Lư
 Kim Sơn
 Nho Quan
 Yên Khánh
 Yên Mô

 2 provincial cities:
 Ninh Bình (capital)
 Tam Điệp
They are further subdivided into seven commune-level towns (or townlets), 122 communes, and 16 wards.

Geography
Ninh Bình is located to the south of the Northern Delta, between the Red and Ma rivers. It is bordered by Hòa Bình and Hà Nam to the north, Nam Định to the northeast, and Thanh Hóa to the south and west. Ninh Bình also has a very short coastline abutting the Gulf of Tonkin.

The population is 898,500 people, with a total area of 1,329.4 km2.

Demographics
The ethnic groups include the Viet (also called the Kinh, the Vietnamese ethnic majority), as well as other groups such as the Dao, Hoa, Hmong, Mường, Nùng, Tày and Thai. There are 23 ethnic groups, of which the Kinh account for more than 98%.

Sights

Natural sights
 Tam Cốc-Bích Động
 Thung Nham Ecotourism Zone (Khu du lịch sinh thái Thung Nham)
 Múa Caves (Hang Múa)
 Tràng An
 Cúc Phương: primitive forest and ancient inhabited cave (Nho Quan)
 Địch Lộng cave and pagoda (Gia Thành - Gia Viễn)

Ninh Bình was selected as among the main locations for the movie Kong: Skull Island.

Conservation centers 

Bear Sanctuary Ninh Bình
Endangered Primate Rescue Center
 Carnivore and Pangolin Conservation Program
 Turtle Conservation Center

Ecological sights 

 Cúc Phương National Park
 Van Long Wetland Nature Reserve

Historic sights
Bích Động pagoda and cave
 Bái Đính Temple
 Ban Long Pagoda
 Dinh and Le Temples
 Hoa Lư ancient capital
 Hoa Lư Citadel; Nhat Tu Pagoda
 Phát Diệm Cathedral (Phát Diệm - Kim Sơn)

The old city of Ninh Bình is a well-known historical site in Vietnam.

Gallery

Festivals
 Thái Vi festival (Ninh Hải - Hoa Lư) (third moon of the lunar calendar)
 Trường Yên Festival
 Yên Cư Festival
 Nộn Khê Festival

Handicrafts
Embroidered handicrafts in Hoa Lư District
Sea reed handicrafts in Kim Sơn District

Transportation
Ninh Bình is located 91 km from Hanoi and has both rail and road transport links. It has express rail connections with Hanoi in the north and Thanh Hóa and Vinh in the south. Buses from Hanoi's South Bus Station stop by Ninh Bình; the bus routes parallel and complement the rail route.

Etymology 
The province's name derives from Sino-Vietnamese 寧平.

External links 

 
Provinces of Vietnam